Pierre Jacques Antoine Béchamp (16 October 1816 – 15 April 1908) was a French scientist now best known for breakthroughs in applied organic chemistry and for a bitter rivalry with Louis Pasteur.

Béchamp developed the Béchamp reduction, an inexpensive method to produce aniline dye, permitting William Henry Perkin to launch the synthetic-dye industry. Béchamp also synthesized the first organic arsenical drug, arsanilic acid, from which Paul Ehrlich later synthesized salvarsan, the first chemotherapeutic drug.

Béchamp's rivalry with Pasteur was initially for priority in attributing fermentation to microorganisms, later for attributing the silkworm disease pebrine to microorganisms, and eventually over the validity of germ theory.

Béchamp claimed to have discovered that the "molecular granulations" in biological fluids were actually the elementary units of life. He named them microzymas—that is, "tiny enzymes"—and credited them with producing both enzymes and cells while "evolving" amid favorable conditions into multicellular organisms. Béchamp also denied that bacteria could invade a healthy animal and cause disease, claiming instead that unfavorable host and environmental conditions destabilize the host's native microzymas and decompose host tissue by producing pathogenic bacteria.

While cell theory and germ theory gained widespread acceptance, granular theories have been rejected by current scientific consensus.  Béchamp's version, microzymian theory, has been retained by small groups, especially in alternative medicine. His work in understanding how the "terrain" may affect disease may have implications in emerging microbiome research. Suggested further by Manchester "Béchamp led himself into a theory of such generality that was both its strength and its weakness—it could be used to explain too much, but did not lend itself to experimental testing".

Early life, family and education 
Béchamp was born in Bassing, France in 1816, the son of a miller. He lived in Bucharest, Romania from the ages of 7 to 18 with an uncle who worked in the French ambassador's office. He was educated at the University of Strasbourg, receiving a doctor of science degree in 1853 and doctor of medicine in 1856, and ran a pharmacy in the city. In 1854 was appointed Professor of Chemistry at the University of Strasbourg, a post previously held by Louis Pasteur.

Career
In 1856, after receiving his medical degree, Béchamp took a position at the University of Montpellier, where he remained until 1876 when he was appointed Dean of the Catholic Faculty of Medicine at Université Lille Nord de France. Béchamp's time in Lille was stormy, as his dispute with Pasteur led to efforts to have his work placed on the Index Librorum Prohibitorum (the index of books prohibited by the Catholic Church). Béchamp retired under this cloud in 1886, briefly ran a pharmacy with his son, and ultimately moved to Paris, where he was given a small laboratory at the Sorbonne. One of his students was Victor Galippe, a physician who studied micro-organisms in plants and their role in human health. He died at the age of 91, his work having faded into scientific obscurity and Pasteur's version of germ theory dominant. A brief obituary in the British Medical Journal noted that Béchamp's name was "associated with bygone controversies as to priority which it would be unprofitable to recall."

In the modern day, Béchamp's work continues to be promoted by a small group of alternative medicine proponents (also known as germ theory denialists), including advocates of alternative theories of cancer, who dismiss Pasteur's germ theory and argue that Béchamp's ideas were unjustly ignored. They accuse Pasteur, as did The French Academy of Sciences, of plagiarising and then suppressing Béchamp's work, citing work such as Ethel Douglas Hume's Béchamp or Pasteur: A Lost Chapter in the History of Biology from the 1920s.

Literature

See also
Pleomorphism (microbiology)
Terrain theory

References

External links
 About Antoine Bechamp and Pleomorphism (A Distant Mirror, publisher of Bechamp books)
 Bechamp or Pasteur? (Book by E. Hume)
 The Blood and its Third Element (Book by Antoine Bechamp)
 Béchamp Synthesis of para-substituted arylarsenous acids and Transformation of nitro aromatics into amino aromatics 

1816 births
1908 deaths
19th-century French biologists
French microbiologists
19th-century French chemists
Germ theory denialists
Medical controversies
University of Strasbourg alumni
Academic staff of the University of Strasbourg
Academic staff of the University of Lille Nord de France
Academic staff of the University of Montpellier
People from Moselle (department)